Sergei Ogorodnikov (born 1965 in Bavly, Russian SFSR, Soviet Union) is a Russian professional bodybuilder.

Biography

Bodybuilding career 
Began bodybuilding training in 1984 at student gym.

Since 1993 participated in competitions of European and world level.

In 2000 won NABBA Mr. Universe Amateur.

In 2005, after four years of taking second place, won NABBA Mr. Universe Pro.

In 2009 declared his intention to leave the sport due to injury.

Competitive stats 
 Height: 182 cm
 Contest weight: 118 kg
 Off-season weight: 127 kg
 Arms: 18"
 Neck:
 Chest: 141 cm
 Waist: 91 cm
 Thighs: 69 cm
 Calves: 47 cm
 Wrist:
 Ankle:

Bodybuilding titles

See also 
Universe Championships

External links 
musclememory.com > Sergei Ogorodnikov
NABBA Universe 2005 results
NABBA Universe 2000 results
In Russian:
ambal.ru > Сергей Огородников
musclememory.ru > Сергей Огородников
«Победа — это секундная радость»
Качок в будущее

1965 births
Living people
Russian bodybuilders
People from Bavlinsky District
Sportspeople from Tatarstan